The black-collared jay (Cyanolyca armillata) is a  jay found in Andean forests in Ecuador, Colombia and Venezuela. It was formerly considered conspecific with the white-collared jay.

References

 Clements, James F. Birds of the World: A Checklist. Vista, CA: Ibis Publishing Company, 2000.

External links
 

black-collared jay
Birds of the Colombian Andes
Birds of the Venezuelan Andes
black-collared jay
black-collared jay